Weightlifting at the 2018 Summer Youth Olympics was held from 7 to 13 October. The events took place at Parque Polideportivo Roca in Buenos Aires, Argentina.

Qualification

Each National Olympic Committee (NOC) can enter a maximum of 4 competitors, 2 per each gender. As hosts, Argentina was guaranteed two quotas, 1 athlete per gender and a further 10 boys and 10 girls was to be decided by the Tripartite Commission. However only 9 girls were selected. The remaining 88 places shall be decided by team classification results from qualification events, namely the 2017 World Youth Championships and five continental qualification tournaments.

To be eligible to participate at the Youth Olympics athletes must have been born between 1 January 2001 and 31 December 2003. Furthermore, NOCs will only be allowed to enter a single athlete in an event and the chosen athlete must have participated in either the 2017 World Youth Championships or a continental championship in 2017 or 2018.

Boys

Girls

 Armenia, Azerbaijan, China, Kazakhstan, Russia, Turkey and Ukraine handed one-year ban from IWF for doping violations. Afterwards IWF lifted doping suspensions against Turkey, Armenia and Azerbaijan.

Medal summary

Medal table

Boy's events

Girl's events

Notes
  Supatchanin Khamhaeng of Thailand originally won the gold medal, but was disqualified in 2019 after testing positive for a banned substance.

References

External links

Official Results Book – Weightlifting

 
2018 Summer Youth Olympics events
Youth Summer Olympics
2018
International weightlifting competitions hosted by Argentina